Pavol Baláž (born 1 April 1984) is a Slovak football midfielder.

References
 1. FC Tatran Prešov profile 
 

1984 births
Living people
People from Partizánske
Sportspeople from the Trenčín Region
Slovak footballers
FC Nitra players
FK Dubnica players
1. FC Tatran Prešov players
MFK Topvar Topoľčany players
FK Inter Bratislava players
Ruch Chorzów players
ŁKS Łódź players
Association football midfielders
Expatriate footballers in Poland
Slovak Super Liga players
Ekstraklasa players
Slovak expatriate footballers
Slovak expatriate sportspeople in Poland